Alex Găvan (born 19 May 1982) is a leading Romania
mountaineer specializing in Himalayan climbing of 8000 meter peaks without using supplemental oxygen or sherpa support in his ascents. By now Alex had successfully climbed seven 8000 meter peaks. Since 2006, Alex runs a special project to climb all fourteen 8000 meter mountains in the world. At the present moment, he is the first Romanian climber to reach the summit of Gasherbrum I, Makalu and Shishapangma. His other three successful climbs of Cho Oyu, Manaslu and Broad Peak are second Romanian ascents. In 2006, with the successful ascent of Cho Oyu, Alex became at 24 years old the youngest Romanian ever to have climbed an eight thousand meter peak and was among the few who freely spoke about the Nangpa La shootings. He was awarded with "The 2007 Romanian Sportsman of the Year in High Altitude Mountaineering" by the Romanian Federation of Alpinism and Sport Climbing for the first Romanian ascent of Gasherbrum I.

8000 m+ mountains summited 
 2006: Cho Oyu (8.201 m) - second Romanian ascent, without bottled oxygen 
 2007: Gasherbrum I (8.080 m) – first Romanian ascent, without bottled oxygen, alpine style
 2008: Makalu (8.485 m) – first Romanian ascent, without bottled oxygen 
 2011: Manaslu (8.156 m) – second Romanian ascent, without bottled oxygen 
 2013: Shishapangma (8.027 m) - first Romanian ascent, without bottled oxygen
 2014: Broad Peak (8.047 m) - second Romanian ascent, without bottled oxygen
 2019: Gasherbrum II (8.035 m) - third Romanian ascent, without bottled oxygen

Other notable ascents 
 2004: Chapaeva (6.130 m)
 2005: Mont Blanc (4.810 m) – Miage – Bionnassay route

Notes 
In 2007 and 2008, Alexandru Găvan attempted Gasherbrum II (8.034 m), but due to bad weather and high risk of avalanches, he was forced to retreat, both times, at 7.000 m.

References

External links
 Alexandru Găvan’s personal website
 Alex Gavan, Viata ca-n montagne-russe 
 Alex’s short movies on top of Cho Oyu, Gasherbrum I   and Makalu 

Living people
Romanian mountain climbers
1982 births